The City of Derry Building Society was a UK building society based in Derry, County Londonderry, Northern Ireland
known until 2001 as the Londonderry Provident Building Society. It was a member of the Building Societies Association.

It was the smaller of just two building societies based in Northern Ireland, the other being Belfast's Progressive Building Society with which it merged on 1 July 2014.

The society had only one office, its current Carlisle Road premises which it moved to in 1993.  At that time, it was the smallest UK building society with only £5 million in assets, growing to just £12 million by 2000.

In 1996, it became so popular due to coming near the top of savings rate league tables, that it temporarily refused new business from outside Northern Ireland.  In 2006, the society was still restricting membership to local residents.

The name change in 2001 was prompted in part by earlier vandalism of the society's sign due to the Derry/Londonderry name dispute; it was opposed by local unionist politician, Gregory Campbell.  The society was one of 12 institutions that did not sign up at the launch of the 2001 revised banking code.

City of Derry Building Society was the name of another local building society, that also traces its first registration back to 1876.  That society (number 4BNI) merged with Nationwide Anglia Building Society by a transfer of engagements on 30 September 1987.

References

External links
City of Derry Building Society
 KPMG Building Societies Database 2008
Former City of Derry Building Society (15 May 1876 – 30 Sep 1987) at FSA Mutuals Public Register
Current City of Derry Building Society (28 Apr 1876–) at FSA Mutuals Public Register

Former building societies of the United Kingdom
Banks established in 1876
Organizations established in 1876
Banks disestablished in 2014
Economy of Derry (city)
Organisations based in Derry (city)
1876 establishments in the United Kingdom
2014 disestablishments in Northern Ireland